The Supreme Court of Thailand, located in Bangkok, Thailand, is the highest Thai court of justice, covering criminal and civil cases of the entire country. Operating separately from the  Administrative Court and the Constitutional Court, the judgment from the Supreme Court is considered as final. Neither plaintiff nor respondent can request for any further appeals.

A Justice of the Supreme Court can be appointed from among justices of the Court of Appeals having seniority, extensive knowledge and experience. The current President of the Supreme Court is Judge  Piyakul Boonperm  (Thai: ปิยกุล บุญเพิ่ม).

History

Historically, there was no Supreme Court since a Thai monarch would adjudicate all disputes as the sole supreme judicial authority. Citizens appealed directly to the King along his route to places out of the Palace. This system existed until the early Rattanakosin Era; the reign of King Rama IV.

During the reign of King Rama V, an official department for appeals was set up in the Palace, and in 1891, the king created the Ministry of Justice. The Judicator Act of 1909 was also enacted under Rama V's reign. This act established the Supreme Court as the highest court in the country, and cases were no longer appealed to the king.

After Thailand adopted a democratic, constitutional form of government during the Siamese revolution of 1932, the Judicator Act of 1934 was enacted to amend the previous Judicator Act of 1909. The courts were divided into three levels, namely, Court of First Instance, Court of Appeals, and the Supreme Court.

Jurisdiction
The Supreme Court of Thailand acts as the final court of appeal in all civil and criminal cases in the entire kingdom. An order or judgment of the Supreme Court in all kinds of cases is final.

A party who challenges an order or a judgment issued by the Courts of First Instances, the Court of Appeal or the Courts of Appeal Regions I – IX, has the right to appeal against the lower court’s order or judgment, following the conditions and circumstances as required by law.

Specialized laws such as the procedural laws on labor, tax, intellectual property, and international trade allow parties to appeal against judgments of such specialized courts directly to the Supreme Court.

Composition

The Court consists of the President, Vice Presidents, the Secretary, and a number of justices. In the present-day juridical system, the President of the Supreme Court is also the head of the Courts of Justice.

At least three justices of the Supreme Court form a quorum. At present, the Supreme Court has divided the justices internally into 25 quorums. Each quorum has three justices; the most senior justice in a quorum is the presiding justice of the quorum.

The Supreme Court has ten divisions for specialized cases, namely,
 Division of Juvenile and Family
 Division of Labour
 Division of Taxes
 Division of Intellectual Property and International Trading, including copyright law of Thailand
 Division of Bankruptcy
 Criminal Division of Holders of Political Positions
Division of Commerce and Economy
 Environmental Division of the Supreme Court
 Division of Consumer
 Division of Election Cases

Specialized divisions have nine justices in each division, as assigned by the President of the Supreme Court, and, also, one Chief Justice or Presiding Justice supervising the work of the division. The judgment will be made by the majority of votes among justices in the quorum after each of justice’s written opinion and oral statement to the meeting before making a decision.

Functions and procedure
After being reviewed and brought through the initial process of administrative work, the appeals against judgment of the lower courts to the Supreme Court will be assigned to justices of the Supreme Court by the President of the Supreme Court on a case by case basis. This process often takes approximately 15 days. However, there are some kinds of special cases such as intellectual property, tax, bankruptcy, and, international trade which are the exception. In addition, some criminal cases in which the defendants are in custody during the trials are given priority.

The Adjudication process of the quorum of the Supreme Court occurs when the court allows plaintiff and respondent to present the factual and legal issues from their sides in the trial. This process can take from a few months to the expiry of the case, depending on the decision the senior judges of the case made as appropriate.

Afterward, a draft of judgment or order is released. The examination process by the Research Division or approval process by a certain specialized division can then take place. This process can take up to a month. The procedure ends with the transmission of a case file with a judgment of the Supreme Court to the Court of First Instance for pronouncement.

See also 

 Judiciary of Thailand

References

External links
Thai Judicial Court System 
Official website 

Law of Thailand
Government of Thailand
Judiciary of Thailand
Thai
1891 establishments in Siam
Courts and tribunals established in 1891
Network monarchy